Moston is a civil parish, containing the small village of Moston Green in the unitary authority of Cheshire East and the ceremonial county of Cheshire, England. According to the 2001 Official UK Census, the population of the entire civil parish was 375, increasing to 405 at the 2011 Census.

See also

Listed buildings in Moston, Cheshire East

References

External links

Villages in Cheshire
Civil parishes in Cheshire